Leovino R. Austria (born March 14, 1958)  is a Filipino professional basketball coach and former player. He last served as the head coach of the San Miguel Beermen of the Philippine Basketball Association (PBA).

Playing career

Austria played his college basketball for the Lyceum of the Philippines University while also suiting up in the commercial Philippine Amateur Basketball League via Masagana 99. In 1984, he was named the Most Valuable Player of the Ambassador's Cup before joining the PBA.

In 1985, a new team Formula Shell drafted him, aside from nabbing fellow PABL standout Sonny Cabatu in the said draft. He made a quick impact for the new but veteran laden Shell squad and won the Rookie of the Year honors at season's end. His average of 3.9 points per game for that season marked the lowest average for a Rookie of the Year awardee up to that time. During his stint at Shell, he played backup point guard for Bernie Fabiosa, Al Solis, then Ronnie Magsanoc. He later played for Pepsi and was out of the league after the 1993 season. In 394 games played, he averaged 4.5 points a ballgame. He was known for his three-point shooting.

In 1988, he was awarded the Quezon Medalya ng Karangalan Award for Sports. The QMK Award is given to outstanding Quezonians who excelled in their chosen fields. In 1999, he suited up for a few games as a playing coach for his team Chowking due to injuries of his point guards.

Coaching career

Philippine Basketball League

Austria's first coaching stint was for Chowking during the late 90s. During those days, he steered Chowking to numerous semifinal appearances but were unable to clinch a finals appearance against powerhouse and PBA-bound team Tanduay, Red Bull, and Welcoat.

After Chowking was renamed as Shark Energy Drink in 2000, he led the team to two titles in four finals matches against Welcoat from 2000 to 2002. He coached a team led by Chester Tolomia, Roger Yap, Ervin Sotto, and Gilbert Malabanan.

In late 2002, he moved to former rival Welcoat Paints as its new head coach after returning from a one conference absence. With a star-studded lineup of Rommel Adducul, Paul Artadi, Eddie Laure, Ronald Tubid, and Marc Pingris, he led the Paintmasters to the 2002 PBL Challenge Cup championship over Dazz in a three-game sweep.

He later led Welcoat to a runner-up finish in 2003 with James Yap as one of its star players.

Shell Turbo Chargers

In 2004, Shell dismissed American head coach John Moran and named Austria as its new head coach, 19 years after starting his PBA career with the said team. During his only season with the Turbo Chargers, he coached a young but talented team of Tony dela Cruz, Ronald Tubid, Rookie of the Year Rich Alvarez, Billy Mamaril, and Roger Yap to two semifinal appearances and a third-place finish in the 2005 PBA Fiesta Conference. However, Shell disbanded after the 2004–2005 season. He then returned to the amateur ranks.

Adamson Falcons

In 2006, Austria was named head coach of the Adamson Falcons in the UAAP replacing Mel Alas after a disappointing 3-11 stint. With him at the helm, the Falcons made their first-ever Final Four appearance since the format was introduced. However, they were eliminated by the Ateneo Blue Eagles in a closely fought semifinals. He coached the team until in 2013, following a dismal UAAP Season 76 campaign, he resigned.  In seven seasons serving as Adamson's tactician, he piled up an overall win–loss record of 40–56, including three trips to the Final Four in Seasons 69, 73 and 74.

Rain or Shine Elasto Painters/Welcoat Dragons
In 2006, Welcoat bought the Shell franchise to join the PBA as its 10th member. With this development, Austria was renamed head coach of the Welbest franchise, this time carrying the banner of Rain or Shine Elasto Painters in preparation for their PBA debut. The Painters placed third in the 2006 PBL Unity Cup in the team's final conference.

He was formally named as the head coach of the Welcoat Dragons in the PBA. But after two seasons with the team, in 2008, he resigned as head coach citing that the management wanted a new direction. His former assistant Caloy Garcia took over his spot.

San Miguel Beermen (ABL)

Austria coached the San Miguel Beermen in the ABL where he was awarded as the Coach of the Year in 2013 and helped the team win the championship that same year.

San Miguel Beermen in the PBA

In 2014, Austria renewed his ties with the San Miguel franchise by signing a one-year deal to be the head coach of the Beermen. He won his first championship with SMB as a PBA head coach after defeating the Alaska Aces in seven games of the 2014–15 PBA Philippine Cup Finals. But in the Commissioner's Cup the Beermen failed to qualify in the playoffs. However, in the season ending tournament of the Governor's Cup he was able to steer the Beermen to another championship once again against the Aces this time in a sweep.

Austria later coached the team to seven more championships out of the next eight Finals appearances, which started with the 2015–16 PBA Philippine Cup Finals, in which they came back from an 0–3 deficit. When the Beermen lost to the Barangay Ginebra San Miguel in the 2018 PBA Commissioner's Cup Finals, it was the team's first Finals loss under Austria.

Personal life 
Austria is married to his wife Nanette. Nanette had a kidney transplant on the afternoon Austria won the 2018 PBA Philippine Cup. They have three kids, including Bacon, a basketball player himself. Bacon won the 2013 PBA D-League Foundation Cup with Blackwater Sports a day after his father won the 2013 ABL Finals with the San Miguel Beermen. Father and son have previously been on opposing teams in the UAAP, with Leo coaching Adamson, and Bacon playing for Ateneo.

Coaching record

Professional record

Collegiate record

References

External links
 The top 20 players of the PBL
 Ex-player Austria named new Shell Turbochargers coach
 Past Quezon Medalya ng Karangalan awardees (Leo Austria was awarded the QMK for Sports in 1988)

1958 births
Living people
ASEAN Basketball League coaches
Basketball players from Quezon
Filipino men's basketball coaches
Filipino men's basketball players
Rain or Shine Elasto Painters coaches
Player-coaches
Shell Turbo Chargers players
TNT Tropang Giga players
Tagalog people
Lyceum Pirates basketball players
Shell Turbo Chargers draft picks
Adamson Soaring Falcons basketball coaches
San Miguel Beermen coaches
Shell Turbo Chargers coaches